The Avenger is a 1933 American drama film directed by Edwin L. Marin and starring Ralph Forbes, Adrienne Ames and Arthur Vinton. The screenplay concerns a former district attorney who seeks vengeance against the gang who framed him leading to his disgrace.

Cast
 Ralph Forbes as Norman Craig 
 Adrienne Ames as Ruth Knowles 
 Arthur Vinton as James Gordon 
 Claude Gillingwater as Witt 
 Charlotte Merriam as Sally 
 J. Carrol Naish as Hanley 
 Berton Churchill as Forster 
 Murray Kinnell as Cormack 
 Thomas E. Jackson as McCall 
 Paul Fix as Vickers
 Leonard Carey as Talbot 
 James Donlan as Durant 
 Boothe Howard as Ames

References

Bibliography
 Monaco, James. The Encyclopedia of Film. Perigee Books, 1991.

External links
 Watch this film on YouTube - https://www.youtube.com/watch?v=ysssLH0at-A&t=37s 

1933 films
1933 drama films
1930s English-language films
American drama films
Films directed by Edwin L. Marin
Monogram Pictures films
American black-and-white films
1930s American films